= Chhatanag =

Village in Uttar Pradesh, India

Chhatanag is a village in Prayagraj, Uttar Pradesh, India.
